Commercial sexual exploitation of children (CSEC) is a commercial transaction that involves the sexual exploitation of a child, or person under the age of consent. CSEC involves a range of abuses, including but not limited to: the prostitution of children (e.g. survival sex, street prostitution, child sex tourism, gang-based prostitution, intra-familial pimping), child pornography (including live streaming sexual abuse),  stripping, erotic massage, phone sex lines, internet-based exploitation, and early forced marriage.

According to the National Center for Missing and Exploited Children (NCMEC), roughly one out of every five girls and one out of every ten boys will be sexually exploited or abused before they become of age.

Terminology
The Declaration and Agenda for Action, adopted during the First World Congress against Commercial Sexual Exploitation of Children, held in Stockholm, Sweden, in 1996, formally defines CSEC as:

 a fundamental violation of children's rights. It comprises sexual abuse by the adult and remuneration in cash or kind to the child or a third person or persons. The child is treated as a sexual object and as a commercial object. The commercial sexual exploitation of children constitutes a form of coercion and violence against children, and amounts to forced labour and a contemporary form of slavery.

CSEC is often associated with child trafficking, which is defined as "the recruitment, transportation, transfer, harbouring or receipt of a child for the purpose of exploitation," and a child as any person under the age of 18. However, not all trafficked children are trafficked for the purposes of CSEC. Furthermore, the sexual abuse of child trafficking victims at work may not necessarily constitute CSEC. Likewise, CSEC is also part of, but distinct from other forms of child abuse and child sexual abuse, including child rape and domestic violence.

Types

Prostitution 
Child prostitution is the use of a child in sexual activities for remuneration." Prostitution is known as one of the oldest professions. Nearly 80% of adult prostitutes entered the industry between 11 and 14. Prostituted children face risks of damage to their physical and mental health, early pregnancy, and sexually transmitted diseases, particularly HIV. They are inadequately protected by the law and may be treated as criminals.

Child sex tourism
Child sex tourism refers to tourism by predators for the purpose of engaging in child prostitution. Sex tourism and sex trafficking generate revenue for countries. In some countries, with economies that rely on the exploitation of women and children, the government encourages child sex tourism, resulting in low fines for engaging in the sex trade. Many travel agencies offer guides on exotic entertainment, further encouraging men to travel for sexual purposes.

Pornography
Child pornography is the "representation, by whatever means, of a child engaged in real or simulated explicit sexual activities or any representation of the sexual parts of a child for primarily sexual purposes". These representations include photographs, books, audiotapes, and videos that depict children performing sexual acts with other children, adults, and objects. The children are subjected to exploitation, rape, pedophilia, and in extreme cases, murder. 

Pornography is often used as a gateway into the sex trade industry. Many pimps force children into pornography as a way of conditioning them to believe that what they are doing is acceptable. Pimps may then use the pornography to blackmail the child and extort money from clients.

Live streaming sexual abuse
Child victims of live streaming sexual abuse are forced to perform sex acts in real time in front of a webcam while watching the paying customers on-screen and following their orders. This occurs in locations commonly referred to as 'cybersex dens' that can be homes, hotels, offices, internet cafes, and other businesses. Traffickers advertise children on the internet to obtain purchasers, and overseas predators often seek out and pay for these illicit services.

Causes
The supply and demand for children in the sex trade industry is greatly influenced by the structure of a country. Kevin Bales says the increase of children sold into prostitution reflects the industrial transformation the country has experienced in the last fifty years. Young girls in Thailand are commonly from northern areas. Because of the harshness of the land and a family's dependency on a good harvest many families see their daughters as commodities.

On the macro-level of causes for child sexual exploitation is the globalization of the consumer market and the influx of new goods and services that encourage new forms of consumerism. The amount of money offered to parents for their children is often too good to refuse because they are living at or below the poverty level. The children are turned over to the buyer without any knowledge of what they were sold into.
	
Other macro-level influences include the expansion of construction sites and military bases in developing countries. These installations attract those who wish to sexually exploit children for large sums of money. The men who participate in the sexual exploitation of children at these installations are most often from developed countries and have no regard for the children. "It has been alleged that military personnel figure at a disproportionately high rate in the pedophile exchange lists confiscated by some police departments."

Families who sell their daughters to brothels tend to repeat the pattern with their younger daughters. The younger daughters, however, are more willing to go. This is because their older sisters tell them stories of their extravagant times in the city. The girls admire their sister's western clothes and money. The younger girls then enter into prostitution with little notion of what they are getting themselves into.

Dangers and consequences
Whether the children be in pornography, brothels, or trafficked they are all at risk for sexually transmitted infections, physical violence, and psychological deterioration. Research has shown that "fifty to ninety percent of children in brothels in Southeast Asia are infected with HIV." In many cases when children are brought into the sex trade industry they are beaten and raped until they are so broken they no longer try to escape. Physical hazards can also include infertility, cervical cancer, assault, and sometimes murder. Pregnancy is also a physical risk factor for many children. Much like if they are found to have HIV or AIDS the girls are thrown out of the brothels with nowhere to go. Many of the children "break the conscious link between mind and body" in order to function in these situations (Bales 221). By doing so, many children begin to think they are nothing more than "whores" and some develop suicidal thoughts. Other psychological risk factors include sleep and eating disorders, gender-disturbed sexual identity, hysteria, and even homicidal rage.

Outside physical and psychological dangers lies fear of the law. Many girls and women are illegally trafficked across borders. If they manage to escape from the brothel or pimp, the women and children quickly come to the attention of the authorities. Because they do not have proper documentation they are detained by the authorities. If they are held in local jails, the women and children often suffer further abuse and exploitation by the police.

Prevalence

While it is impossible to know the true extent of the problem, given its illegal nature, International Labour Organization (ILO) global child labour figures for the year 2003 estimate that there are as many as 1.8 million children exploited in prostitution or pornography worldwide.

The Rapid Assessment survey, developed by the ILO's International Programme for the Elimination of Child Labour (IPEC) and United Nations Children's Fund (UNICEF), relies on interviews and other, mainly qualitative, techniques, to provide a picture of a specific activity in a limited geographic area. It is a highly useful tool for collecting information on the worst forms of child labour, like CSEC, that is difficult to capture with standard quantitative surveys.

General knowledge offered to a child can decrease the likelihood of children being exploited into prostitution or pornography. A national campaign in Thailand provided "9 years of basic education, ... awareness-raising activities to change attitudes about child prostitution, and a surveillance system to prevent children from being coerced into prostitution."

UNICEF and the United Nations Population Fund (UNFPA) estimate that 2 million children are exploited in prostitution or pornography every year.

International agreements
In 1989, the UN General Assembly adopted the Convention on the Rights of the Child (UNCRC), the first international agreement to recognize the human rights of children, with freedom from sexual exploitation included as a basic right. Notably, Article 34 commits countries to "prohibiting inducement or coercion of children into unlawful sex acts, prostitution, or pornography." Currently, all United Nations member states except for the United States are parties to the UNCRC.

In 1996, the First World Congress Against the Commercial Exploitation of Children adopted the Declaration and Agenda for Action, which formally reframed child prostitution as CSEC, and committed participants to develop and enforce national plans of action against CSEC; a follow-up Second World Congress was held in 2001.

Following these conferences, the UN took additional steps to address CSEC. Between 2002 and 2003, the UN adopted the Optional Protocol on the Sale of Children, Child Prostitution, and Child Pornography, which has more detailed commitments on the protection of children, including reporting and monitoring. The vast majority of countries have also ratified this protocol. Also adopted was the Protocol to Prevent, Suppress, and Punish Trafficking in Persons Especially Women and Children, which was the first international agreement to formally define human trafficking. Additionally, specialized organizations under the UN (UNICRI, UNODC, ILO, WTO) have established efforts focused on CSEC, including research, data collection, reporting, training, and anti-trafficking strategy and implementation.

The same committee that put the Optional Protocol into action has put more effort into acquiring more accurate data on child sexual exploitation. The 2012 Global Report on Trafficking in Persons shows that with the Protocol in place countries without a child sexual exploitation offense have nearly halved. At the regional level, criminal convictions of trafficking offenses have increased.

In 2010, the UN instated a Global Plan of Action against Trafficking in Persons. This plan involves strengthening the abilities of law enforcement to identify victims of trafficking, enhance investigations of alleged cases, and prosecute and punish the many corrupt officials who partake in sex trafficking and tourism.

Prevention

Education 
One of the many ways to aid in CSEC prevention is through education. The previously mentioned Protocol requires members to provide preventative measures against child sexual exploitation; among these preventative measures is educating the public, especially families, on the dangers of sex tourism and trafficking. World Vision is one of the leaders in creating these educational opportunities for young girls. Other efforts involve educating police, medical, and school personnel on how to identify CSEC victims and respond in a situation involving CSEC, and educating potential CSEC victims about the tactics recruiters often use to reach at-risk individuals.

See also
Child sexual abuse
Cybertip.ca
Demons of Eden
ECPAT
FBI
Immigration and Customs Enforcement (ICE)
International Programme on the Elimination of Child Labour
Mongolian Gender Equality Center
OneChild
Towards the Elimination of the worst forms of Child Labour
Trafficking in human beings
Trafficking of children
United States Postal Inspection Service

Relevant ILO conventions and recommendations
Worst Forms of Child Labour Convention
Worst Forms of Child Labour Recommendation

Notes

References
 IACAC-International Agency for Crimes Against Children

Further reading

External links

 * IACAC - International Agency for Crimes Against Children - Child Exploitation, Trafficking, & Cyber Crimes Tactical Initiative
 Child Sex Tourism Data Havocscope Black Markets
 Trafficking in Minors for Commercial Sexual Exploitation - United Nations Interregional Crime and Justice Research Institute

Child labour
Child sexual abuse
Forced prostitution
Child prostitution
Sex trafficking
Rape
Sexual exploitation